Maksim Valeryevich Semakin (born 26 October 1983) is a Russian former professional football player. He played as a defensive midfielder.

Club career
He made his Russian Premier League debut for FC Ufa on 8 August 2014 in a game against FC Amkar Perm.

External links
 

1983 births
Living people
Russian footballers
Sportspeople from Krasnoyarsk
FC Kuban Krasnodar players
FC Volga Nizhny Novgorod players
FC Ural Yekaterinburg players
FC Ufa players
Russian Premier League players
FC Luch Vladivostok players
FC Yenisey Krasnoyarsk players
Association football midfielders